Holger Jens Schünemann (born 8 March 1967 in Braunschweig, Germany) is a physician and professor of medicine and Clinical epidemiology. From 1 February 2009 to 30 June 2019 he was the chair of the Department of Health Research Methods, Evidence, and Impact (formerly the "Department of Clinical Epidemiology and Biostatistics") at McMaster University in Hamilton, Canada, where he now works as full professor.

He also holds positions as professor at the University at Buffalo, Department of Medicine, US; visiting professor at the University of Freiburg, Germany; director of Cochrane Canada; and director of the McMaster GRADE Centre.

Education 
Schünemann studied epidemiology (M.Sc. in epidemiology, 1997) during his postdoctoral fellowship in molecular and cellular biology.  He then conducted population-based studies on the association between oxidative stress, micronutrients and respiratory health with a promotion to a Ph.D. degree (epidemiology & community medicine, 2000) and also completed training in internal medicine and preventive medicine at the Medical School of Hannover, Germany, and at the University at Buffalo, where he joined the faculty in 2000.

Career 
From 2005 to 2009 Schünemann was at the Italian National Cancer Center in Rome, Italy, before moving to McMaster University as a full-time professor and becoming chair of clinical epidemiology and biostatistics. In his second term as chair of this prestigious department, he led the strategic plan to refocus the department as the "Department of Health Research Methods, Evidence, and Impact (HEI)", a first of its kind. 

Schünemann’s scientific work focuses on evidence synthesis, quality of life research and the development and presentation of healthcare recommendations spanning several disciplines from Clinical Medicine to Public Health.

Schünemann has authored or co-authored over 700 peer-reviewed publications. He has been named by Thomson Reuters as one of the most influential 3,000 scientific minds of current times across scientific disciplines (from agriculture to zoology) annually since 2015 and is listed amongst the 500 most highly cited scientists.

Schünemann is director of Cochrane Canada, a member of Guidelines International Network's Board of Trustees, a member of the advisory committee on health research at the World Health Organization (WHO), co-director of the McMaster University WHO collaborating center for infectious diseases, research methods and recommendations, and director of the McMaster GRADE center.

Guidelines development and GRADE methodology 

As a key contributor to the revised methods for WHO guideline development in 2006, and the Institute of Medicine statement on trustworthy guidelines in 2011, Schünemann has co-led the reshaping of guideline development methodology. He is co-chair of the GRADE Working Group, for which he coined the name GRADE and has played a major role in disseminating its spirit of collaboration, openness, the advancement of evidence assessment, and the creation of better health care recommendations. GRADE is an acronym for Grading of Recommendations Assessment, Development and Evaluation. The result of the group’s efforts is a common, sensible, and transparent approach to grading the quality (or certainty) of evidence and grading the strength of healthcare recommendations – this is called the GRADE approach.

Schünemann’s work also focuses on the practical application of scientific evidence by researchers and clinicians, through co-inventing tools like the GRADEpro guideline development tool, and pioneering the use of GRADE Evidence to Decision tables, now reworked as GRADE Evidence to Decision Frameworks.

With his colleagues Schünemann has recently created a "go to" crowdsourcing portal for developers of healthcare recommendations in collaboration with the Guideline International Network.

He also is on the steering group for the new INGUIDE Guideline Development Credentialing & Certification Program.

References

External links
Faculty page at McMaster University
Biography on the Guidelines International Network website

German public health doctors
University at Buffalo faculty
1967 births
Living people
Academic staff of McMaster University
Medical journal editors
Physicians from Braunschweig
Academic staff of the University of Freiburg